Dholi Dhaja (White Flag) Dam across the Bhogavo River is located near Surendranagar city and in the urban area of Surendranagar Dudhrej Municipality in the state of Gujarat, India.

Purpose
It provides drinking and utility water to 300,000 to 400,000 people of Surendranagar, Wadhwan, Joravarnagar and Ratanpar.

Tourism
On 26 January 2010, Narendra Modi, then Chief Minister of Gujarat, announced that Dholidhaja Dam will be developed as a tourist destination.

60,000 trees have been planted near the dam.

It has developed into a very good picnic spot.

Transport
It is located in the west of  Surendranagar. Dholidhaja Dam can be reached via Muli Highway or via Dalmill-Khamisana Road.

References

Dams in Gujarat
Surendranagar
Dams completed in 1959
1959 establishments in Bombay State
20th-century architecture in India